Theaudience (styled as theaudience) were an English rock band, formed in London in 1996. They released one album and saw three singles enter the UK Singles Chart. The band's singer Sophie Ellis-Bextor became a successful solo artist after the band's disbandment.

History 
Theaudience were founded by guitarist Billy Reeves, formerly of the indie group Congregation. The group were fronted by Sophie Ellis-Bextor and included drummer/producer "Patch" Hannan (ex-The Sundays), keyboard player Nigel Butler (ex-The Bridge), guitarist Dean Mollett (ex-Porcupine) and bass guitarist Kerin Smith. Their one self-titled album received critical acclaim and reached No. 22 in the UK Albums Chart, with two of four singles released reaching the Top 40 in the UK Singles Chart.

Reeves left the band in December 1998, and although the remaining band members wrote and demoed at least 33 songs for a second album, it was rejected by record label Mercury Records, who then dropped the band, which split in 1999. Approximately half of these tracks were leaked onto the internet, most of which appeared as a fourteen-track bootleg album in 2009  under the fan-made title Quiet Storm.

Ellis-Bextor started a solo career in  major label artist-driven dance-pop music following the success of her collaboration with Spiller on "Groovejet (If This Ain't Love)" in 2000. Smith and Reeves were later involved with London indie pop band Friends of The Bride.

Discography

Studio albums

Singles

References

External links 
 
 Theaudience page at Sophie-Online.net
 Album review

English rock music groups
Musical groups established in 1996
Musical groups disestablished in 1999
Britpop groups
Sophie Ellis-Bextor